Enneapterygius genamaculatus is a species of triplefin blenny in the genus Enneapterygius. It was described by Wouter Holleman in 2005. This species is endemic to St Brandon shoals, part of Mauritius.

References

genamaculatus
Taxa named by Wouter Holleman
Fish described in 2005
Endemic fauna of Mauritius